Juraj Šutej (Podorašac, 4 December 1889 – Zagreb, 15 April 1976) was a lawyer and Croatian and Yugoslavian politician. He was a member of the Croatian Peasant Party (Hrvatska seljačka stranka, HSS). He was elected member of the Yugoslav Parliament from Duvno and Split districts in 1927, 1935, and 1938 elections. He served as the Yugoslav Finance Minister in the cabinets of Dragiša Cvetković and Dušan Simović in 1939–1941, as well as in the Yugoslav government-in-exile under Ivan Šubašić. In the Provisional Government of the Democratic Federal Yugoslavia dominated by the Communist Party of Yugoslavia (Komunistička partija Jugoslavije, KPJ) and led by Josip Broz Tito, Šutej was a minister without portfoilio. He resigned the post in October 1945 along with Šubašić (then the foreign minister) in protest against KPJ's breaches of the Tito–Šubašić Agreements which were the basis of the government. The HSS boycotted the 1945 Yugoslavian parliamentary election, but Šutej unsuccessfully tried to revive its political work in 1946 before being overruled by the HSS leadership – prompting him to retire from politics.

1889 births
1976 deaths
Croatian lawyers
Croatian Peasant Party politicians
Croats of Bosnia and Herzegovina
Finance ministers of Yugoslavia